The languages of Suriname refers to the languages and various dialects spoken in established communities within the country.

Sources